The 2015–16 Northern Ireland Football League is the third season of Northern Ireland's national football league running independently as the Northern Ireland Football League, consisting of the top three levels of the national league system, namely: the Premiership, Championship 1, and Championship 2. It is also the 115th season of Irish league football overall. The season began on 8 August 2015 and will conclude in May 2016.

Crusaders are the defending champions, after securing last season's title for the fifth time in the club's history on 18 April 2015 – their first title since the 1996–97 season.

Four clubs will be relegated out of the Northern Ireland Football League at the end of the season, as the national league system reduces in size to 36 clubs – three tiers of 12 clubs.

Promotion and relegation
Promoted from Championship 1 to the Premiership
 Carrick Rangers (1st in NIFL Championship 1)

Relegated from the Premiership to Championship 1
 Institute (12th in NIFL Premiership)

Promoted from Championship 2 to Championship 1
 Lurgan Celtic (1st in Championship 2)
 Annagh United (2nd in Championship 2)

Relegated from Championship 1 to Championship 2
 PSNI (13th in Championship 1)
 Dundela (14th in Championship 1)

Relegated from Championship 2 to Level 4 Regional League
 Ballymoney United (15th in Championship 2)

League tables

Premiership

Championship 1

Championship 2

Play-offs

UEFA Europa League play-offs
A new method of Europa League qualification was introduced for this season. In the vast majority of seasons, the Irish Cup winners finish seventh or higher in the Premiership. In this scenario, the four remaining Premiership teams from the top seven that have not already qualified for Europe (the teams in positions 3–7 excluding either the Irish Cup winners or the third-placed team awarded the berth) will compete in a series of play-offs for the final place in the Europa League. The play-offs are seeded, with the two higher-placed qualifiers given home advantage when facing the two lower-placed qualifiers in the semi-finals. The two semi-final winners then meet in the final.

If however, the Irish Cup winners finish lower than seventh in the league, all five Premiership teams that finish in third to seventh will qualify for the play-offs. This will require an additional quarter-final match to be played by the two lowest-placed qualifiers in sixth and seventh, with the winner joining the other three clubs in the semi-finals.

Semi-finals

Final

NIFL Premiership play-off
The club that finishes in 11th place in the Premiership will play the play-off qualifier from the 2015–16 NIFL Championship 1 over two legs for a place in next season's Premiership. The Premiership club will play the first leg away from home, with home advantage for the second leg.

NIFL Championship play-off
The club that finishes in 11th place in Championship 1 will play the Championship 2 runners-up over two legs for a place in the 2016–17 NIFL Championship – the inaugural season in which the Championship will hold senior status. The play-off losers will enter the 2016–17 NIFL Premier Intermediate League, which will replace Championship 2 and will remain intermediate. The 11th-placed Championship 1 club will play the first leg away from home, with home advantage for the second leg.

References

External links
Northern Ireland Football League website
BBC Sport

2015-16
0